Raja Nain Singh Nagar also known as Raja Nain Singh Gurjar of Parichhatgarh was a notable 
Gurjar king of Meerut district in the Indian state of Uttar Pradesh in the 18th century. He was one of the powerful Gurjar Kings of that time, other being Raja Ram Dayal Singh Gurjar of Landhaura, and Rao Ajit Singh Gurjar of Dadri and many more.

Restored Fort Parikshitgarh

The Fort Parikshitgarh was restored by Raja Nain Singh in the 18th century. The fort was dismantled in 1857, to be used as Police Station. His  relative from Rajisthan  Kadma Bhati also joined him in 1857.

References

History of Uttar Pradesh
Medieval India
Hindu monarchs